Gérald Charles Genta (1 May 1931 – 17 August 2011) was a Swiss watch designer and artist. He is known for his eponymous line of timepieces as well as his design work with other high-end watch manufacturers, including IWC, Omega SA, Universal Genève, Patek Philippe and Audemars Piguet. Christie's auction house of New York has called Genta's work "the Fabergé of watches", while The Wall Street Journal has called them the "world's most complicated and pricey watches".

Early life
Genta was born in Geneva to a Swiss mother and father of Piemonte (Northern Italian) descent. At age 20, Genta finished jewellery and goldsmith training in Switzerland, earning his Swiss Federal Diploma.

Starting career with Universal Genève 
Subsequently, Genta was recruited by Universal Genève SA, at the time one of the most recognized manufactures in both the U.S. and Europe for its chronograph models. After Universal Genève settled a patent dispute involving the micro-rotor caliber, Genta designed Universal's Polerouter Microtors in the 1950s, as well as the Golden and White Shadows during the mid-1960s. The Shadows contained a micro-rotor, unisonic and accutron movement, the latter two a result of the quartz crisis starting in the late 1960s.

Notable watch designs 
Genta's work with Universal would be a precursor to future collaborations with other brands in Switzerland and throughout Europe, including Omega's Constellation (1959); Patek Philippe's Golden Ellipse (1968). Audemars Piguet's Royal Oak (1970), IWC's Ingenieur (1976); Patek Philippe's Nautilus (1976); and Cartier's Pasha de Cartier (1985).

Audemars Piguet Royal Oak 
One of Genta's most recognisable designs was that of the Audemars Piguet Royal Oak, which was considered to be the first luxury sports watch in the world. The watch was inspired by traditional diving helmets and therefore featured exposed screw heads as well as a unique case design. The watch also featured an integrated bracelet.

Patek Philippe Nautilus 
In 1976, Patek Philippe introduced the Nautilus collection, designed by Genta, after deciding it was time to produce an exclusive sport watch with finishes of the highest quality. The first model was Ref. 3700 and was made of steel. The Nautilus was released by Patek Philippe during the quartz crisis in the hope that it would help re-attract people's attention to high-end Swiss mechanical watches.

The Nautilus collection played a key role in Patek Philippe's overall marketing strategy as it had to refresh the brand image while perpetuating tradition. The target was represented by dynamic business managers of the new generations. The Nautilus wristwatch has become one of the most popular collections from Patek Philippe, and the Ref. 5711 & 5712 models, which the company introduced in 2006 to celebrate the 30th anniversary of the collection, are among the most popular models. Today the model Ref - 5711 has become a true icon of success and style as it is adorned by various famous celebrities and sports stars.

IWC Schaffhausen Ingenieur SL "Jumbo" Ref.1832 
Designed by Gerald Genta in 1974 and manufactured by IWC Schaffhausen in 1976, the Ingenieur SL Automatic Ref. 1832 is considered one of the most sought-after watches in IWC’s history. As part of IWC’s SL collection of luxury steel sports watches launched in the 1970s, the timepiece became known and appreciated for both its strong aesthetic codes and technical refinements: rubber buffers absorbed heavy shocks and impacts, while a soft iron inner case protected the automatic movement caliber 8541 from strong magnetic fields. Due to its large size and an impressive case diameter of 40 mm, which was particularly unique for its time, the Ingenieur SL was soon known among watch aficionados as the “Jumbo”.

Gerald Genta created the Ingenieur SL during the quartz crisis , a challenging period for IWC and the entire watch industry. At that time, the watch manufacturer aimed at expanding its product portfolio to include more mechanical watches in stainless steel. Genta was commissioned to find a new visual identity for IWC’s Ingenieur, the manufacturer’s first anti-magnetic watch for civilian use developed in the 1950s. In his design of the new, robust Ingenieur model in stainless steel, Genta successfully highlighted its distinctive technical character. The watch’s integrated H-link bracelet, structured dial and, above all, the screw-on bezel with five recesses became the Ingenieur SL’s trademark features.

Eponymous brand & Designs 

After starting his own brand in 1969, Genta would create the sonneries, among them the Gérald Genta Octo Granda Sonnerie Tourbillion, which contained four gongs and an emulated Westminster Quarters bell ring at each quarter and on the hour, "the same melody rung out by London's Big Ben", and priced at $810,200. In 1994, he designed the Grande Sonnerie Retro, the world's most complicated wristwatch, and priced at approximately $2 million. For private requests, Genta hand-designed the movements, dials and cases of his timepieces and employed limited or no external assistance, outsourcing or mechanization during the process; it was not unusual for a single watch to take up to 5 years to complete.

During the 1980s, Genta obtained special licensing with The Walt Disney Company and distributed a limited edition of Disney character watches to the public; previously, they had been an unofficial private request by one of Genta's repeat customers. The dials consisted of illustrations of Mickey Mouse, Minnie Mouse, Donald Duck, Scrooge and Goofy, with cases made of 18 carat gold. Designed in Le Brassus, Switzerland, the watches retailed between $3250–$3650 in 1988.

During latest '80s design the GEFICA SAFARI presented in Baselworld 1984 . First bronze case watch in history. Has a bronze compass on the deployante clasp, a complicated annual calendar and moonphase mecha quartz movement. The dial benefits of lapis lazuli or Coral insert, 18k gold accents and hands and real Shark leather strap. First version came in ardesia or real tortoise shell dial. Meteorite or mother of Pearl version came after as elephant strap. There were other versions during  the  90s done in full gold or automatic chrono based on valjoux 7750.

Famous clients 

Genta's clients have included athletes, business people, musicians, movie stars, politicians, and royalty, including Prince Rainier of Monaco, King Hassan II of Morocco, King Juan Carlos and Queen Sofia of Spain, King Fahd of Saudi Arabia and Queen Elizabeth The Queen Mother of England.

Acquisition by Bulgari 
After his eponymous company, trade marks, patents and designs were acquired by Bulgari in 2000, Genta resigned and created a new venture called Gerald Charles. As of 2010, Gerald Genta watches were marketed solely under the Bulgari brand. In 2019, Bulgari celebrated the 50th anniversary of the Gerald Genta mark.  A re-edition of Bronze Gefica was done during  2003 with automatic movement and bigger diameter .

Family and posterity 
With his wife and business partner Évelyne, Gérald had two children: Frédéric Genta and Alexia Genta.

During his life, Gerald Genta drew over 100 000 watch designs. When he died, he left Évelyne Genta over 3200 of his designs. This huge selection of drawings is made up of his most famous designs but mostly of unseen pieces. One hundred of them are being auction by Sotheby's in Spring 2022, each with a corresponding NFT.

After Gérald died on 17 August 2011 at the age of 80, Evelyne Genta founded in 2019 the Gerald Genta Heritage association in order to honor his unrivalled contribution to the watch industry as well as encourage and nurture young talent in the industry. The association created the yearly Gérald Genta Prize in order to reward "the young talented designers and the high potentials of watchmaking".

External links 
 Gerald Genta Heritage

References

1931 births
2011 deaths
Swiss people of Italian descent
Businesspeople from Geneva
Swiss watchmakers (people)